Marcelo Damián Vega (born 16 September 1986) is an Argentine professional footballer who plays as a midfielder for Almirante Brown.

Career
Vega started out his career with Torneo Argentino C's Villa Cubas. Deportivo Morón of Primera B Metropolitana signed Vega in 2006. He remained in Morón for four years, scoring ten goals in one hundred and thirty-two appearances. On 30 June 2010, Vega moved to Aldosivi. He made his debut on 7 August against CAI, which was one of sixty-five matches he featured in over two seasons as they secured seventh and eleventh place finishes; he also scored three times. Vega joined Primera B Nacional side Olimpo in 2012. He netted against Rosario Central, Ferro Carril Oeste and Atlético Tucumán as they won promotion to the Primera División.

Between 2013 and 2014, Vega had stints in the second tier with Talleres, where he suffered relegation, and All Boys before agreeing to play for Barracas Central in Primera B Metropolitana. In 2016, Almirante Brown became Vega's eighth club. Two goals in forty-two fixtures followed, with his last appearance occurring on 30 June 2017 versus Deportivo Español. Third tier Platense completed the signing of Vega in the succeeding July. His first campaign, 2017–18, concluded with Platense winning the league title to gain promotion to Primera B Nacional.

Career statistics
.

Honours
Platense
Primera B Metropolitana: 2017–18

References

External links

1986 births
Living people
People from La Matanza Partido
Argentine footballers
Association football midfielders
Torneo Argentino C players
Primera Nacional players
Primera B Metropolitana players
Deportivo Morón footballers
Aldosivi footballers
Olimpo footballers
Talleres de Córdoba footballers
All Boys footballers
Barracas Central players
Club Almirante Brown footballers
Club Atlético Platense footballers
Sportspeople from Buenos Aires Province